Mouth Sweet is a 2016 video game by L.O.V.E Games, the outlet of independent developer Mitchell Hall, created using RPG Maker 2003. Satirically described as a "realistic game about exactly what it's like to work as an office temp", Mouth Sweet is a exploration horror game that tasks the player with completing an increasingly bizarre and disturbing series of tasks in an office. The game received praise for its complex and unsettling themes of workplace depersonalization and novel audio-based combat system.

Plot  

The player is invited to work as an assistant with the firm Chalfont, Chalfont & Chalfont, although they are immediately denied the opportunity to provide the player character with a nominated name and appearance, either being given the name Haas or Alice. They are introduced by their colleague Vivienne and given a PDA to complete errands for the firm, and invited to meet the CEO. On the way to the CEO's office, the player encounters a dead body, a matter the CEO dismisses and asks the player to "lighten up" about. Returning to the office, Vivienne provides the player with a revolver, warning the player that there are "invisible people in the hallways", or Bugs, they must defend themselves from. 

Following this, the player is given a series of increasingly bizarre and disturbing tasks from their PDA, including arbitrarily arranging boxes, unwittingly providing a poisoned sandwich to Vivienne, who dies, pulling the legs off of a live bird, and dissecting a colleague with a scalpel. Between tasks, the CEO continues to berate the player for their negative attitude and questioning whether the player "wants to be here". The player ultimately decides to abandon the tasks and escapes with their manager, Honoreé, as the environment of the office turns increasingly grotesque and horrific upon their exit. It is revealed by Honoreé that the player has been working with Chalfont, Chalfont & Chalfont for three years over the course of the game. Honoreé encourages the player to "hang in there" as they look for another job.

In the coda of the game, a message from the developer is displayed, expressing that things "aren't looking up" and "aren't getting better", and that the game was made "in an attempt to talk myself out of ending it all," expressing hope that their depression will end in time and thanking the player for playing the game.

Gameplay 

Similar to other RPG Maker games, Mouth Sweet is mostly played in a conventional top-down perspective, although it does not feature any role playing mechanics. Players use the directional keys to navigate and progress dialog through text boxes. However, the game also contains a unique directional sound-based battle system. In 'Explore Mode', the player navigates rooms from a top-down perspective using the arrow keys. In certain rooms encountered during the game, invisible enemies will pursue the player, their direction and proximity measured by the intensity of footsteps in stereo sound. When an enemy is close, the player enters 'Combat Mode', a side-scrolling shooter view in which the player attempts to shoot the invisible enemy. Players are required to shoot the enemy when the footstep noises are centered in the stereo mix, indicating the enemy is in front of the player. Players have limited ammunition and collect bullets whilst exploring the rooms in the game.

Development 

Hall has stated that the premise for Mouth Sweet was sourced from "my own anxieties and my own struggles to survive," and a desire to tell his audience "what lies in store for them in the real world: it sucks, and everyone is trying to kill you while telling you you're just imagining it the whole time," although leaving open a message of hope. The game also addresses the theme of dysphoria, a recurrent queer motif in Hall's body of work, reflected by the denial of the player's chosen name and appearance throughout the game in a manner similar to deadnaming. Hall's visual direction in Mouth Sweet was inspired by the monochrome display of the Game Boy, stating "the old acid-green pallor of the Game Boy always looked slightly-otherworldly somehow, in an interesting way. I feel it helped create an atmosphere with no color, no warmth, and no hope." 

Following concerns raised by players arising from the ending message to the game, Hall stated in a postmortem in 2017 that he was "doing a lot better now" and on antidepressants, expressing gratitude for interest in the game and remarking the game "pretty much came out exactly how I wanted it to."

Reception 

Mouth Sweet received praise from critics for its unsettling premise and horror gameplay. Dari of Indie Hell Zone described the game as "uncomfortable (and) tense" and conveying a "rigid atmosphere", providing special praise to the sound design and music as an "integral part of the game." Indie Overlook stated the game was "simultaneously thrilling, humorous, somewhat scary, and surprisingly honest and personal in its writing and themes." Critics also praised the game's satire of the dehuminisation inherent in corporate culture. Interpreting the core theme of the game as the "nightmare (of) the workplace, of which the Bugs feel like a manifestation", Dari of Indie Hell Zone discussed that the game represented "workplace anxiety", such as "the feeling that you're being watched incessantly (and) the looming fear of being terminated." Writing for Giant Bomb, Colin Spacetwinks stated the game was effective at "digging further into what makes these environments miserable, inhospitable and even dangerous," praising the game as "deeply empathetic in admitting its misery and fear to others." Indie Overlook stated the game critiques the "toxic and dehumanizing aspects of corporate culture", praising the "clever and strikingly authentic arc to the narrative as a whole" in exploring the tensions between "your choices as the player and the protagonist's sense of self" being "ruthlessly, systematically and deliberately cast aside."

References

External links

2016 video games
Freeware games
Horror video games
Indie video games
Linux games
Monochrome video games
RPG Maker games
Windows games
Single-player video games